The 1997–98 Florida State Seminoles men's basketball team represented Florida State University as members of the Atlantic Coast Conference during the 1997–98 NCAA Division I men's basketball season. Led by first-year head coach Steve Robinson, the Seminoles reached the NCAA tournament as No. 12 seed in the Midwest region. After knocking off No. 5 seed TCU in the opening round, Florida State was beaten by No. 13 seed Valparaiso, 83–77 in overtime. The team finished with an overall record of 18–14 (6–10 ACC).

Roster

Schedule and results

|-
!colspan=9 style=| Regular Season

|-
!colspan=9 style=| ACC Tournament

|-
!colspan=9 style=| NCAA Tournament

Rankings

References

Florida State Seminoles men's basketball seasons
1997 in sports in Florida
Florida State
Florida State